Shields' Mill Covered Bridge, also known as Shieldstown Covered Bridge, is a historic covered bridge located in Brownstown Township and Hamilton Township, Jackson County, Indiana.  It spans the White River and is a multiple kingpost Burr Arch Truss bridge.  It was built 1876, and is a two-span wooden bridge resting on cut limestone pier and abutments.  It measures 365 feet, 6 inches, long.  The bridge was closed to traffic in 1970.

It was listed on the National Register of Historic Places in 2016. The bridge was restored in 2019.

References

Covered bridges on the National Register of Historic Places in Indiana
Bridges completed in 1876
Transportation buildings and structures in Jackson County, Indiana
National Register of Historic Places in Jackson County, Indiana
Road bridges on the National Register of Historic Places in Indiana
Wooden bridges in Indiana
Burr Truss bridges in the United States